"Harper Valley PTA" is a country song written by Tom T. Hall, which in 1968 became a major international hit single for country singer Jeannie C. Riley. Riley's record, her debut, sold over six million copies as a single, and it made her the first woman to top both the Billboard Hot 100 and the U.S. Hot Country Singles charts with the same song (but not at the same time), a feat that would not be repeated until Dolly Parton's "9 to 5" 13 years later in 1981. It was also Riley's only Top 40 pop hit.

Story
Riley sings a story about Mrs. Johnson, a "Harper Valley widowed wife" whose teenage daughter, a student at the junior high school, comes home one day with a note for her mother signed by the parent–teacher association (PTA) secretary, in which they scold her for "wearing your dresses way too high", for reports about her drinking and running around with multiple men, and that she shouldn't be raising her daughter that way. Outraged, Mrs. Johnson decides to pay an unannounced visit to the PTA, who happened to be holding a meeting that afternoon.

To the PTA's surprise Mrs. Johnson, wearing a miniskirt, walks in and addresses the meeting, exposing a long list of indiscretions on the part of the members:
Bobby Taylor, who had asked Mrs. Johnson for a date seven times (Mrs. Johnson also mentions Bobby's wife, who "seems to use a lot of ice" in his absence, implying that she hosts her own lovers when he is away);
Mr. Baker, whose secretary had to leave town for an undisclosed reason;
Widow Jones, who leaves her window blinds wide open and little to onlookers' imaginations;
Mr. Harper, who was absent from the meeting because "he stayed too long at Kelly's Bar again"; and
Shirley Thompson, who also has a drinking problem, as evidenced by gin on her breath.

Mrs. Johnson then rebukes them for having the audacity to declare her an unfit mother, referring to the town as "a little Peyton Place" and labeling the PTA a bunch of hypocrites.

In the final stanza of the song, Riley states that the story is true, and in the final line identifies herself as the daughter of Mrs. Johnson when she sings, "...the day my mama socked it to the Harper Valley PTA".

Cultural references
The song makes two references to short hemlines ("you're wearing your dresses way too high"; "wore her miniskirt into the room") in reference to the miniskirt and the minidress, which had been gaining popularity in the four years since they were first introduced.

The expression "This is just a little Peyton Place" is a reference to the Peyton Place television show based on the earlier novel and film of the same name where a small town hides scandal and moral hypocrisy behind a tranquil facade. The show, then in the top 20 of Nielsen ratings, was in its fourth season when "Harper Valley P.T.A." was released.

The final line of the song ("..the day my mama 'socked it to' the Harper Valley PTA") was a reference to "Sock it to me!", a very popular catch-phrase frequently used in Rowan & Martin's Laugh-In. According to Shelby Singleton, producer of Riley's record, this line was changed at the last minute, at the suggestion of his "wife at the time".

Inspiration
In 2005, Hall noted that he had witnessed a similar scenario when he was a child in Olive Hill, Kentucky, in the mid-1940s; the mother of one of Hall's classmates had drawn the ire of local school board members for her modern ways, and the school was taking out their frustrations on her daughter. The mother gave a verbal tongue-lashing at the school, an iconoclastic move that was unheard of at the time.

Legacy
Riley, who was working as a secretary in Nashville for Jerry Chesnut, got to hear the song and recorded it herself and it became a massive hit for her.  The single's jump from 81 to 7 in its second week on the Billboard Hot 100 in late August 1968 is the decade's highest climb into that chart's Top Ten. Riley's version won her a Grammy for the Best Country Vocal Performance, Female. Her recording was also nominated for "Record of the Year" and "Song of the Year" in the pop field.

Shortly after "Harper Valley PTA" reached its peak in success, singer-comedian Sheb Wooley, using his alter-ego Ben Colder, recorded a parody version called "Harper Valley PTA (Later That Same Day)." In the parody version, Colder meets up with the PTA board members (each of whom Mrs. Johnson called out in the original) at Kelly's Place and attempts to explain their characters in a positive vein. He eventually finds the PTA members more interesting to be with. Colder's version reached No. 24 on the Billboard Hot Country Singles chart in late 1968, and No. 58 on the Billboard Hot 100.

The song later inspired an eponymous 1978 motion picture and short-lived 1981 television series, both starring Barbara Eden as the heroine of the story, Mrs. Johnson, who now has a first name: Stella.

In the 1970s, Riley became a born-again Christian, and though she briefly distanced herself from the song when she began singing gospel music, she never excluded it from her concerts, and it was always her most requested and popular number. She titled her 1980 autobiography From Harper Valley to the Mountain Top, and released a gospel album in 1981 with the same title.

Sequel
In 1984, Riley recorded a sequel song, "Return to Harper Valley", which was also written by Tom T. Hall, but failed to chart. In the sequel, Riley sings as Mrs. Johnson, who is now a grandmother. She observes that some townsfolk conquered their vices while others did not.

Norwegian translation
"Harper Valley PTA" was translated by  into Norwegian as "Fru Johnsen". A recording by Inger Lise Rypdal was released in 1968. It charted for 16 weeks, peaking at first place, which it held for nine weeks in a row. However, the song faced controversy over its lyrics as they discussed double standards in Christian milieu, leading to serious debate over the song in the Storting (Norwegian Parliament).

Chart performance

Weekly charts
Jeannie C. Riley

Sheelah Mack cover

Year-end charts

See also 
 Harper Valley PTA
 Harper Valley PTA (TV series)
 Ode to Billie Joe

References

External links
 Lyrics of this song
 Jeannie C. Riley – 
 Dolly Parton – 

1968 singles
1967 songs
Billboard Hot 100 number-one singles
Cashbox number-one singles
Jeannie C. Riley songs
Songs about school
Songs with feminist themes
Songs written by Tom T. Hall
Number-one singles in Australia
RPM Top Singles number-one singles